The Citroën ZX is a small family car produced by the French manufacturer Citroën between 1991 and 1998.

At the beginning of the 1990s, the ZX was Citroën's entry in the class traditionally dominated in Europe by the Ford Escort and Vauxhall/Opel Astra, a market segment Citroën had briefly abandoned with the demise of the GSA in 1986.

The BX had tried to address the small family car market and the large family car market by being "between sizes" but well packaged. For 1993, the Citroën ZX chassis was also used for the Peugeot 306 which, with its attractive Peugeot 205 derived styling, was an even more successful car than its twin. The Citroën Berlingo and Peugeot Partner were also built on the front half of the same platform, the rear coming from the 405, an arrangement shared underneath the Xsara Picasso.

It was replaced by the Xsara in September 1997, but production in Europe continued until 1998.

China
The ZX was the first Citroën built in China. A saloon derivative, called the Citroën Elysée, along with the China-based ZX known as the Fukang, continued to be produced for the Chinese market by the Dongfeng Peugeot-Citroën Automobile, a joint venture with the Dongfeng Motor Corporation.

Model History 

The Citroën GS had been a ground breaking and radical new model in the small family car market on its launch in 1970, scooping the European Car of the Year award, and was facelifted in 1979 and gained a hatchback which saw it transformed into the GSA.

However, such was the success of the larger BX after its 1982 launch, that PSA decided to delay the launch of an immediate replacement for the GSA when it was finally discontinued in 1986. Development work began on a new C segment hatchback, which was originally expected to be launched as the Citroën FX at the beginning of the 1990s.

Although the Rally Raid version of the ZX debuted during 1990, the ZX was officially launched on the left hand drive continental markets on 16 March 1991, with British sales beginning in May that year, initially only with petrol engines. The diesel ZX went on sale later in 1991. The ZX was helped at the time of introduction by having reached the market a few months before the new version of the Opel/Vauxhall Astra.

The sales target was about 230,000 vehicles per year, with half of that number going outside of France.

It went on sale in New Zealand in the beginning of 1993, as a five door in 1.6 Aura or Turbodiesel trim, with the naturally aspirated diesel and Volcane GTi (1.9) models joining a few weeks later. New Zealand's unleaded petrol was of a low octane rating, meaning that initially only uncatalyzed cars were on offer.

In January 1994, the estate of the ZX debuted, and went on sale in May, shortly thereafter followed by a mid-cycle facelift.

The first examples of the ZX had been produced in 1990, with the three door Rally Raid model being the winner of the Paris-Dakar, which started just after Christmas. The first prototypes of the ZX had actually debuted at the Baja Aragon on 20 July 1990. Drag resistance ranged from Cds 0.30 to 0.33.

The launch of the ZX marked the return of Citroën into the C sector of the car market; it had discontinued the GSA in 1986 with no immediate replacement, largely due to the success of the larger BX. However, Citroën had decided to phase out the BX between 1990 and 1993, by at first launching a smaller model, and then adding a larger model (the Xantia) to its range.

The ZX's interior space and value received praise from critics and consumers. Of particular note was the rear seat arrangement; it was mounted on a sliding platform that allowed the seat to be moved rearwards to increase rear legroom, or forwards to increase cargo space. Unfortunately, only the seat backs folded down on models so fitted. Lower specification models with fully folding and removable seats had more ultimate capacity. The ZX specification was good for its class, with most models getting power steering, electric windows, electric sunroof, a driver's side (and sometimes passenger's side) airbag and anti-lock braking system as either optional or standard equipment. It was competitively priced though, unlike the Mark III Volkswagen Golf, which was priced at a relative premium from its launch later in August 1991.

The familiar range of PSA powertrains drove the front wheels of a seemingly conventionally designed chassis. At the front was a standard MacPherson strut layout with anti-roll bar, while the rear used the PSA Peugeot-Citroën fully independent trailing arm/torsion bar set up that was first introduced on the estate of the Peugeot 305.

However, PSA's chassis engineers employed some unusual features, including passive rear-wheel steering (by means of specially designed compliance bushes in the rear suspension), and in house developed and constructed shock absorbers. At high mileages, this is prone to wear off the axle mounting bushes, which is easily fixed.

It is also prone to wear in the rear axle trailing arm bearings, which then wear the trailing arm axle tubes, requiring an expensive rebuild or a replacement axle assembly. The diesel and larger capacity petrol engines are canted as far back as possible in the engine bay, in an effort to put as much weight as possible behind the front axle line, also reducing the centre of gravity, while improving weight distribution and minimising understeer.

Models
At the time of its launch, the ZX range consisted of a collection of four very individual trim levels; the base model was the "Reflex" aimed at young people, next was the "Avantage" aimed at families, and then there was the luxury "Aura" series. The final series was the relatively sporting "Volcane" series, with lowered (and hard) suspension. The "Volcane" TD was one of the first diesel hot hatches.

Over time, further models were introduced including the "Furio", a cheaper sports model, a 16 valve engined high performance derivative and many special editions.

The ZX was initially available as a three or five door hatchback, while a five-door estate was added to the range in 1994. It was offered with petrol engines from 1.1 L to 2.0 L, as well as three 1.9 L diesel engines including a turbodiesel. However, the 1.1 petrol engine was never sold in Britain.

Sales and production

Motorsport
The car won the Paris-Dakar Rally four times — in 1991 with Ari Vatanen and in 1994, 1995, 1996 with Pierre Lartigue, claiming a total 59 stage wins.

It also won five FIA World Cup for Cross-Country Rallies titles, four by Pierre Lartigue between 1993-1996 and one by Ari Vatanen in 1997.

In terms of rallycross, the ZX 16V Turbo in the hands of Kenneth Hansen (rallycross) took two FIA European Rallycross Championship titles. 1994 and 1996.

The ZX Kit Car, a front-wheel-drive naturally aspirated rally car built to the F2 rules, won the 1997 Spanish rally championship thanks to Jesús Puras.

References

External links

 Citroën World: ZX links
 Dongfeng Fukang, the Chinese ZX
 The AA Car Test Reports – Citroen ZX
 Citroen ZX Rally Raid Evo II #11 driven by Vatanen, Waldegard and Salonen

ZX
Compact cars
Front-wheel-drive vehicles
Hatchbacks
Station wagons
Cars introduced in 1991
Rally cars
Dakar Rally winning cars
2000s cars